David Ligare is an American contemporary realist painter. Contemporary Realism is an approach that uses straightforward representation but is different from photorealism in that it does not exaggerate and is non-ironic in nature.

Biography
Since 1978, he has focused on painting still lifes, landscapes, and figures that are influenced by Greco-Roman antiquity. Chief among his stated influences are the aesthetic and philosophical theories of the Greek sculptor Polykleitos and the mathematician and philosopher Pythagoras, as well as the work of the 17th-century classical painter Nicolas Poussin. A resident of Salinas, California, his paintings often depict the terrain of the central Californian coast in the background. "I think that I'm very Californian in the character of the light that I use, but I made a decision very early on in my project to try to be an invisible presence in my work. Personal expression and having a personal style are very important to many artists but I've been much more interested in how we see - what I call perceptual analysis - and the potential meanings of the objects that I've depicted." - David Ligare

Ligare was born in 1945 in Oak Park, Illinois. He received his formal artistic training at the Art Center College of Design in Los Angeles. His paintings are in the collections of the Museum of Modern Art, New York City, Fine Arts Museums of San Francisco, San Jose Museum of Art, Gabinetto Disegni e Stampe degli Uffizi, Florence, and  Thyssen-Bornemisza Museum of Art, Madrid.

Solo exhibitions
 2014 - "River/Mountain/Sea," Bakersfield Art Museum, Bakersfield,CA 
 2012 - "The Big Sur: Paintings by David Ligare" Chris Windfield Gallery, Carmel, CA
 2012 - “New Paintings" Hirschl & Adler Gallery, New York, NY 
 2010 - "REDUX" Plus One Gallery, London, UK
 2009 - "Primary Structures "Hartnell College Gallery, Salinas, CA
 2008 - "A Sense of Place: An Homage to Robinson Jeffers" Winfield Gallery, Carmel-by-the-Sea, CA
 2007 - Hackett Freedman Gallery, San Francisco, CA
 2006 - "Ritual Offerings" Koplin Del Rio Gallery, Los Angeles, CA
 2005 - "Offerings: A New History" PLus One Gallery, London, UK (Catalog)
 2003 - "Sea Paintings" Koplin Del Rio Gallery, Los Angeles, CA (also 2000, 1998, 1994, 1992, 1988, 1986, 1985, 1983)
 2002 - "Object of Intention: Still Life Paintings" Hackett-Freedman Gallery, San Francisco, CA (also 1999, 1997)

Public Collections
 The M.H. De Young Memorial Museum, San Francisco, CA
 Gabinetto Disegni e Stampe degli Uffizi (The Dept. of Drawings & Prints of The Uffizi) Florence, Italy
 The ARCO Corporation
 Monterey Museum of Art, Monterey, CA
 The Museum of Modern Art, New York
 The Security Pacific Collection
 The Wadsworth Athenaeum Collection, Hartford, CT
 The Hughes Corporation
 Pacific Telesis
 Syracuse University Museum of Art, Syracuse, NY
 The Santa Barbara Museum of Art, Santa Barbara, CA
 The Spencer Museum of Art, University of Kansas, Lawrence, KS
 Knight-Ridder, San Jose, CA
 The Frye Art Museum, Seattle, WA
 Museum of Art & Archaeology, University of Missouri, Columbia, MO
 San Jose Museum of Art, San Jose, CA
 Exxon-Mobil Corporation, Fairfax, VA

References

http://www.artcyclopedia.com/history/contemporary-realism.html
http://www.davidligare.com/
http://plusonegallery.com/Artist-Detail.cfm?ArtistsID=423

Specific

External links
 biography and essay at official website
 essay by curator Patricia Junker
 Monterey Now: David Ligare
  Examples of his artworks
  More examples of his artworks and short essay

1945 births
Living people
Painters from California
Realist artists
20th-century American painters
American male painters
21st-century American painters
21st-century American male artists
20th-century American male artists